Dave's Picks Volume 41 is a three-CD live album by the rock band the Grateful Dead. It contains the complete concert recorded on May 26, 1977, at the Baltimore Civic Center in Baltimore, Maryland. It was released on January 28, 2022, in a limited edition of 25,000 copies.

The album includes one bonus track – "U.S. Blues", the encore from the July 19, 1990 show at Deer Creek Music Center.  This song had been omitted from Dave's Picks Volume 40 due to lack of space.

Critical reception 
On AllMusic Timothy Monger wrote, "May 26, 1977 saw the Dead occupying the Baltimore Civic Center for a spirited night of that era's staples and early workouts from the newly recorded but not-yet-released Terrapin Station album."

Track listing 
Disc 1
First set:
"The Music Never Stopped" (Bob Weir, John Barlow) – 8:07
"Sugaree" (Jerry Garcia, Robert Hunter) – 15:37
"Mama Tried" (Merle Haggard) – 4:12
"Sunrise" (Donna Godchaux) – 4:14
"Deal" (Garcia, Hunter) – 5:48
"Passenger" (Phil Lesh, Peter Monk) – 3:45
"Brown-Eyed Women" (Garcia, Hunter) – 6:02
"Looks Like Rain" (Weir, Barlow) – 8:51
"Jack-a-Roe" (traditional, arranged by Grateful Dead) – 6:23
"New Minglewood Blues" (traditional, arranged by Grateful Dead) – 6:04
"Bertha" (Garcia, Hunter) – 7:21
Disc 2
Second set:
"Samson and Delilah" (traditional, arranged by Grateful Dead) – 8:00
"High Time" (Garcia, Hunter) – 8:11
"Big River" (Johnny Cash) – 7:00
Bonus track – July 19, 1990 Deer Creek encore:
"U.S. Blues" (Garcia, Hunter) – 9:22
Disc 3
Second set, continued:
"Terrapin Station" > (Garcia, Hunter) – 10:57
"Estimated Prophet" > (Weir, Barlow) – 9:42
"Eyes of the World" > (Garcia, Hunter) – 12:31
"Not Fade Away" > (Norman Petty, Charles Hardin) – 16:45
"Goin' Down the Road Feeling Bad" > (traditional, arranged by Grateful Dead) – 8:25
"Around and Around" (Chuck Berry) – 8:11
Encore:
"Uncle John's Band" (Garcia, Hunter) – 7:56

Personnel 
Grateful Dead
Jerry Garcia – guitar, vocals
Bob Weir – guitar, vocals
Phil Lesh – bass
Keith Godchaux – keyboards
Donna Jean Godchaux – vocals
Mickey Hart – drums
Bill Kreutzmann – drums
Note: On "U.S. Blues" Keith and Donna are replaced by Brent Mydland on keyboards and vocals.

Production
Produced by Grateful Dead
Produced for release by David Lemieux
Executive producer: Mark Pinkus
Associate producers: Doran Tyson, Ivette Ramos 
CD mastering: Jeffrey Norman
Recording: Betty Cantor-Jackson
Tape research: Michael Wesley Johnson
Art direction, design: Steve Vance
Cover art: Matt J. Adams
Photos: Peter Simon
Liner notes essay: David Lemieux

Charts

See also 
Dave's Picks Volume 1 – recorded the night before, on May 25, 1977
To Terrapin: Hartford '77 – recorded two nights after, on May 28, 1977

References 

41
Rhino Records live albums
2022 live albums